Girolama Borgia (Catalan: Jerónima de Borja, 1469 - 20 January 1483) was an illegitimate daughter of Cardinal Rodrigo Borgia, later Pope Alexander VI.

Biography  
Girolama Borgia was born in Rome in 1469 to Cardinal Rodrigo Borgia and an unmarried woman whose identity is unknown, who was Borgia's lover before of Vannozza Cattanei. She was the third children of Borgia, after her half-siblings Pedro Luis and Isabella. Her younger half-siblings were the most famous children of Borgia, had by Vannozza Cattanei: Giovanni "Juan", Cesare, Lucrezia and Goffredo "Joffre" Borgia.

Girolama did not receive from her father the titles and wealth that he granted to Vannozza's children when he became Pope, but he recognized her, as evidenced by her marriage certificate, and guaranteed her an income sufficient for a comfortable life.

On 24 January 1482, she was given in marriage to Giovanni Andrea Cesarini, a Roman aristocrat.

She died in Rome the following year, on 20 January 1483.

References  

1469 births
1483 deaths
15th-century Italian women
Renaissance women
House of Borgia
Illegitimate children of Pope Alexander VI
Illegitimate children of popes